Elmshorn-Land is an Amt ("collective municipality") in the district of Pinneberg, in Schleswig-Holstein, Germany. It is situated around Elmshorn, which is the seat of the Amt, but not part of it.

The Amt ("collective municipality") Elmshorn-Land consists of the following municipalities (population in 2005 shown in parentheses):

Klein Nordende (3,034) 
Klein Offenseth-Sparrieshoop (2,718) 
Kölln-Reisiek (2,620) 
Raa-Besenbek (508) 
Seester (978) 
Seestermühe (920) 
Seeth-Ekholt (862)

References

Ämter in Schleswig-Holstein